The County Palatine of Tipperary Act 1715 is an Act of the Parliament of Ireland (2 Geo 1 c. 8). This Act enabled the purchase by the crown of the Palatine Rights in County Tipperary given to the Earls of Ormond, later Dukes of Ormonde, over the preceding centuries. Prior to the Act, the dukes appointed the sheriffs and judges of the county and owned certain revenues from the county which would otherwise have gone to the Crown.

The passing of the Act was followed almost at once by the attainder for treason of James Butler, 2nd Duke of Ormonde, who fled to France on suspicion of being involved in the Jacobite Rising of 1715. Although his titles and estates were restored at the end of the eighteenth century to another branch of the Butler family, there was no question of reviving the Palatine Court, which was by then an anachronism.

List of justices of the Palatine Court of Tipperary

Although the position of Chief Judge, or Seneschal, of the Palatine Court was widely regarded as a sinecure, it is interesting to note that several holders of the office were lawyers of repute, and at least two later held high judicial office. They included:

John Talbot (died c.1575) barrister of Lincoln's Inn 
Sir John Everard, former judge of the Court of King's Bench (Ireland) (died 1624)
Sir William Davys, later Lord Chief Justice of Ireland (died 1687)
Sir John Keating, later Chief Justice of the Irish Common Pleas (died 1691)
Sir John Meade, 1st Baronet (died 1707).

Second justice of the Palatine Court

There was also a second justice, sometimes called the Master of the Rolls, attached to the Palatine court, which suggests that the Court's workload may have been heavier than generally believed. The name of at least three of the second justices are known:

Samuel Gorges (1635-1686), later a justice of the Court of Common Pleas (Ireland)
Sir Theobald Butler (1650-1721), later Solicitor General for Ireland
Sir Standish Hartstonge, 2nd Baronet (c.1671-1751): he had no legal training, so far as is known, although he was the grandson of an eminent judge.

References
Ball, F. Elrington The Judges in Ireland 1221-1921 London John Murray 1926
Hart, A. R. History of the King's Serjeant-at-law in Ireland Dublin Four Courts Press 2000
Kenny, Colum King's Inns and the Kingdom of Ireland Dublin Irish Academic Press 1992
Hayton, David The Anglo-Irish Experience 1680-1730, Politics, Identity and Patriotism Boydell Press 2012

Notes

1715 in law
Acts of the Parliament of Ireland (pre-1801)
History of County Tipperary
1715 in Ireland